Oplerclanis boisduvali is a moth of the family Sphingidae. It is known from dry bush from Senegal to northern Nigeria.

References

Smerinthini
Moths described in 1898
Insects of West Africa
Moths of Africa